Scylacosaurus is an extinct genus of therocephalian therapsids.

References

Scylacosaurids
Therocephalia genera
Permian synapsids
Lopingian synapsids of Africa
Fossil taxa described in 1903
Taxa named by Robert Broom